Stereocidaris is a genus of echinoderms belonging to the family Cidaridae.

The genus has almost cosmopolitan distribution.

Species:

Stereocidaris alcocki 
Stereocidaris baileyi 
Stereocidaris bolli 
Stereocidaris canaliculata 
Stereocidaris capensis 
Stereocidaris cudmorei 
Stereocidaris destefanii 
Stereocidaris excavata 
Stereocidaris fosteri 
Stereocidaris grandis 
Stereocidaris granularis 
Stereocidaris hawaiiensis 
Stereocidaris hispida 
Stereocidaris hudspethensis 
Stereocidaris hutchinsoni 
Stereocidaris indica 
Stereocidaris inermis 
Stereocidaris ingolfiana 
Stereocidaris intricata 
Stereocidaris jaekeli 
Stereocidaris keertii 
Stereocidaris leucacantha 
Stereocidaris microtuberculata 
Stereocidaris monilifera 
Stereocidaris nascaensis 
Stereocidaris opipara 
Stereocidaris purpurascens 
Stereocidaris reducta 
Stereocidaris rugensis 
Stereocidaris sarracenarum 
Stereocidaris sceptriferoides 
Stereocidaris squamosa 
Stereocidaris stylifera 
Stereocidaris sulcatispinis 
Stereocidaris trigonodus 
Stereocidaris tubifera

References

Cidaridae
Cidaroida genera